Sinjeong-dong is a dong, or neighborhood, of Nam-gu in Ulsan, South Korea. Sinjung-dong is further divided into five subdivisions: Sinjeong-1-dong, Sinjeong-2-dong, Sinjeong-3-dong, and Sinjeong-5-dong.

See also
South Korea portal

References

External links
Ulsan Namgu home page

Nam District, Ulsan
Neighbourhoods in South Korea